Paolo Ruberti (born 22 April 1975) is an Italian racing driver who currently competes in the Michelin Le Mans Cup.

Career
Ruberti began his career with karting in his native Italy, before moving on to national-level formula series. In 2008, Ruberti competed in his first 24 Hours of Le Mans, driving for BMS Scuderia Italia in the GT2 class. While testing at the Hockenheimring in 2016, Ruberti suffered a fractured lumbar vertebrae in an accident and missed the 2016 24 Hours of Le Mans, where he was due to drive for Larbre Compétition. Ruberti's first race back from his injury was a second place finish in class at the 2016 6 Hours of Nürburgring. In 2017, Ruberti founded his own racing team in conjunction with Manfredi Ravetto, known as Scuderia Ravetto & Ruberti.

Prior to the 2019 6 Hours of Spa, Ruberti joined the ByKolles LMP1 team for the final two races of the World Endurance Championship season. In 2019, Ruberti also competed in the Lamborghini Super Trofeo North America for the first time, securing his first victory at VIR in August.

During the 2022 24 Hours of Le Mans, Ruberti served as a spotter for the Iron Lynx team.

Racing record

Complete American Le Mans Series results
(key) (Races in bold indicate pole position)

Complete WeatherTech SportsCar Championship results
(key) (Races in bold indicate pole position)

Complete 24 Hours of Le Mans results

References

External links
Paolo Ruberti at FIA WEC Website

1975 births
Living people
Italian racing drivers
People from Legnago
Italian Formula Three Championship drivers
International Formula 3000 drivers
Auto GP drivers
European Touring Car Championship drivers
FIA GT Championship drivers
European Le Mans Series drivers
International GT Open drivers
American Le Mans Series drivers
24 Hours of Le Mans drivers
Blancpain Endurance Series drivers
FIA World Endurance Championship drivers
WeatherTech SportsCar Championship drivers
24 Hours of Daytona drivers
Sportspeople from the Province of Verona
Piquet GP drivers
Kolles Racing drivers
Larbre Compétition drivers
AF Corse drivers
Durango drivers
Prema Powerteam drivers
Le Mans Cup drivers
Iron Lynx drivers